María Nicolasa de Valdés y de la Carrera (January 7, 1733 – December 18, 1810) was the first First Lady of Chile  from September 18, 1810, when her husband became President in Chile's First Government Junta, until her death four months later.

Nicolasa Valdés was of Basque descent, born in Santiago, the second daughter of Domingo de Valdés y González de Soberal and of Ana Francisca de Borja de la Carrera y Ureta. She married Mateo de Toro Zambrano, 1st Count of la Conquista on May 3, 1751, and together they had ten children. She died in Santiago, shortly before her husband, at the age of 77.

Notes

1733 births
1810 deaths
Chilean women
Chilean people of Basque descent
First ladies of Chile
People from Santiago
18th-century Chilean people
19th-century Chilean people